Raaga Trippin are an Indian a cappella group consisting of six vocalists based in Mumbai, India. Formed in May 2012, their work mainly consists of covers of popular Bollywood music and western pop music, sometimes in the form of medleys. These singer-songwriters also sing in Hindi, Telugu, Tamil, French, Spanish, Swahili, Punjabi and other Indian languages. They've worked with Amit Trivedi and A. R. Rahman among others, and have performed at events across India and abroad. They have all worked as backing vocalists for reputed artists.

References

External links

2012 establishments in Maharashtra
Musical groups established in 2012
Singers from Mumbai